Ecuador competed at the 1992 Summer Paralympics in Barcelona, Spain. 3 competitors from Ecuador won no medals and so did not place in the medal table.

See also 
 Ecuador at the Paralympics
 Ecuador at the 1992 Summer Olympics

References 

Ecuador at the Paralympics
1992 in Ecuadorian sport
Nations at the 1992 Summer Paralympics